Avernum 3: Ruined World is a single-player role-playing video game developed by Spiderweb Software. It is the third game in the Avernum trilogy. The game was released for macOS and Windows in January 2018. A version for the iPad has been announced for release on April 18, 2018. Avernum 3 was released simultaneously on Steam, GOG.com, and the web site of Spiderweb Software.

Gameplay

Avernum 3: Ruined World is a single-player role-playing video game. The player controls a group of up to four adventurers, who can use melee weapons, missile weapons, magic, or a mix of these skills to defeat opponents. The game system in Avernum 3 is skill based. Characters choose a character class at the beginning of the game, but this only determines the character's starting skills. The player is then free to train the character in 28 different skills, ranging from melee weapons to arcane lore to first aid. Characters in Avernum 3 have access to over 60 different spells and battle disciplines. These can be spells to inflict damage or summon aid, blessings and curses, and rituals that heal wounded party members. Avernum 3 features elaborate scripted encounters that are intended to encourage a variety of tactics.

Avernum 3 features a large world that evolves as time passes. Towns will fall to the monsters and refugees will move from town to town. An open-ended system allows a variety of different playstyles. The player can fight monsters or ignore the main quest and become a merchant or bounty hunter. Combat in Avernum 3 is turn-based. Creatures in battle take turns acting, during which they can move, use abilities, and attack.

Setting
The Avernum series is the third chapter in the Avernum series. It is based in Avernum, a subterranean nation far under the surface of the world. Avernum is a prison, the destination of petty criminals and rebels from the surface. As Avernum 3 begins, the Avernites have found a way to leave the underworld. However, the surface is being ravaged by waves of monsters. If the player can't find a way to end this invasion, there will be no surface world to escape to.

References

External links
 

2018 video games
Fantasy video games
IOS games
MacOS games
Role-playing video games
Spiderweb Software games
Video games developed in the United States
Video games with isometric graphics
Windows games
Single-player video games